Mendoza zebra is a jumping spider species that lives in Russia. The male was first described in 1992. The species was originally allocated to the genus Marpissa, but was transferred to Mendoza in 1999.

References

Salticidae
Spiders of Russia
Spiders described in 1992
Taxa named by Wanda Wesołowska